Alfeus Handura (born 1 August 1993) is a Namibian footballer who plays as a defensive midfielder for African Stars and the Namibia national football team.

References

1993 births
Living people
Namibian men's footballers
People from Otjozondjupa Region
Association football midfielders
Tura Magic F.C. players
African Stars F.C. players
Namibia international footballers
Namibia A' international footballers
2020 African Nations Championship players